Luc De Smet (born 30 August 1957) is a Belgian former cyclist. He competed in the individual road race event at the 1980 Summer Olympics.

References

External links
 

1957 births
Living people
Belgian male cyclists
Olympic cyclists of Belgium
Cyclists at the 1980 Summer Olympics
People from Wetteren
Cyclists from East Flanders